Fresno is a town and municipality in the Tolima department of Colombia. It was founded in 1574 by Gonzalo Jiménez de Quesada. The population of the municipality was 28,920 as of the 2018 census.

References

External links 
 Official website 
 History of Fresno

Municipalities of Tolima Department